Kamiesberg may refer to:

Kamiesberge, a mountain range in South Africa
Kamiesberg Local Municipality, a village in the Kamiesberge